Gordon Anderson is a squash player from Canada. He was one of the leading hardball squash players in North America in the 1970s.

Anderson won the Canadian national squash title three consecutive times in 1973–1975. He was runner-up at the North American Open in 1979. In 2013, Anderson was inducted into the Ontario Squash Hall of Fame.

Since retiring from top-level competition, Anderson has become a squash club owner in Toronto, and founded Anderson Courts and Sports Surfaces Inc., a firm which specializes in installing squash courts.

References

External links 
 Anderson Courts and Sports Surfaces Inc. website

Canadian male squash players
Canadian people of Scottish descent
Living people
Place of birth missing (living people)
Year of birth missing (living people)